The Static Scherbius Drive provides the speed control of a wound rotor motor below synchronous speed. The portion of rotor AC power is converted into DC by a diode bridge. This drive has the ability of flow the power both in the positive as well as the negative direction of the injected voltage.

References

Induction motors